Nora Municipality (Nora kommun) is a municipality in Örebro County in central Sweden. Its seat is located in the city of Nora.

The amalgamation leading to the present municipality took place already in 1967 and in 1971 the City of Nora became a unitary municipality.

Localities 
 Dalkarlsberg
 Gyttorp
 Järnboås
 Nora (seat)
 Nyhyttan
 Pershyttan
 Striberg
 Vikersvik
 Ås

Riksdag elections

Twin towns
Nora's twin towns with the year of its establishing:

 Kõo, Estonia (1991)
 Fladungen, Germany (1996)
 Hône, Italy (2008)

See also
Nora, Indianapolis (named after Nora in Sweden)
Nora Township, Clearwater County, Minnesota
Nora Township, Pope County, Minnesota

References

External links

Nora Municipality - Official site

Municipalities of Örebro County